"Ocean Drive" is a song by British DJ and record producer Duke Dumont, and features uncredited vocals by Boy Matthews. It was released as the lead single from his seventh extended play, Blasé Boys Club Part 1, on 31 July 2015. A music video for the song was also released on 15 September through Vevo and YouTube. It reached number one in Hungary and Poland, and became the number one song on the 2016 year-end chart in Poland.

"Ocean Drive" charted at thirteenth place on the Triple J Hottest 100, 2015, becoming one of Dumont's most well-known hit singles to date.

Music video
The official music video for "Ocean Drive", which was recorded in the Melrose District of Los Angeles, was uploaded onto Vevo and YouTube on 15 September 2015. It was directed by Ben Wolin and GoodBoyShady and features a group of women partying around the city while the lyrics to the song appear on screen.

Track listing

Charts

Weekly charts

Year-end charts

Certifications

Release history

References

2015 singles
Duke Dumont songs
2015 songs
Number-one singles in Greece
Number-one singles in Hungary
Number-one singles in Poland
Songs written by Jax Jones
Songs written by Duke Dumont